Glen Gould (born June 6, 1971) is an Indigenous Canadian actor, director and producer of Miꞌkmaq and Italian descent. Between 2016 and 2020, he played the role of detective Jerry Commanda on the television series Cardinal.

Career
Gould began performing professionally in Tomson Highway's theatrical troupe, Native Earth Performing Arts (to which Billy Merasty had referred him), and in Theatre New Brunswick; however, his career went on hiatus in 1992 when his parents were killed in a car accident.

Gould resumed performing in 1994, and has subsequently appeared in many Canadian television programs, including Cashing In, Blackstone, North of 60, Cardinal and Tribal, and films, including The Colony, File Under Miscellaneous, Rhymes for Young Ghouls, North Mountain, Monkey Beach, Girl and Bones of Crows.

In 2011, Gould won the Outstanding Performance Award at the Atlantic Film Festival for his role in the film Charlie Zone.

Family
Gould's uncle was Donald Marshall Jr., whose wrongful conviction for murder occurred the day before Gould's birth: Gould's pregnant mother was so shocked by the verdict that she went into labour with him. His first acting role was a minor part in the 1989 film adaptation of Michael Harris's 1986 book Justice Denied, which explored the events leading to Marshall's conviction.

Gould's grandfather was Donald Marshall Sr. His daughter is actress Na'ku'set Gould.

Filmography

Film

Television

References

External links
Official site

1971 births
Living people
21st-century First Nations people
Canadian male film actors
Canadian male television actors
Canadian male voice actors
Canadian people of Italian descent
First Nations male actors
Male actors from Nova Scotia
Mi'kmaq people